The Italian general election of 2001 took place on 13 May 2001.

Both of Aosta Valley's seats to the Italian Parliament were won by the Aosta Valley coalition, composed of the Valdostan Union, Edelweiss and the Autonomist Federation.

Results

Chamber of Deputies

Source: Ministry of the Interior

Senate

Source: Ministry of the Interior

Elections in Aosta Valley
2001 elections in Italy
May 2001 events in Europe